Xu Wenwu is a fictional character portrayed by Tony Leung in the Marvel Cinematic Universe (MCU) film franchise, a composite character based on the Marvel Comics characters the Mandarin and Fu Manchu but lacking the historically negative Yellow Peril stereotypes associated with these characters. In the franchise, Wenwu is the enigmatic and feared leader of the Ten Rings criminal organization and the father of Shang-Chi and Xialing. Wenwu utilizes the legendary Ten Rings — a set of ten mystical iron rings that grants him immortality and unimaginable power.

The Ten Rings organization first appeared in the MCU film Iron Man (2008) and have since been a central part of the MCU. After being impersonated by Aldrich Killian and Trevor Slattery in Iron Man 3 (2013) and being mentioned in the short film All Hail the King (2014), Wenwu made his first appearance in Shang-Chi and the Legend of the Ten Rings (2021).  The character and Leung's performance have received critical acclaim, with some hailing Wenwu as one of the best villains of the MCU.

Concept and creation 
Iron Man originally appeared in American comic books published by Marvel Comics. The character was created by Stan Lee and designed by Don Heck, first appearing in Tales of Suspense #39 (cover dated March 1963)  In the comics, the Mandarin is depicted as a Chinese megalomaniac with aspirations of world conquest, yet who possesses a strong sense of honor. Though a highly skilled martial artist and genius scientist, the main source of the Mandarin's powers are from the ten rings he acquired from a crashed Makluan spaceship, with each ring possessing a unique power and worn on a specific finger. The Mandarin's never-ending war on civilization has led him into conflict with Iron Man, who would eventually become his archnemesis.

Screenwriter Alfred Gough said in 2007 that he had developed an Iron Man film for New Line Cinema which included the Mandarin as the villain, conceiving the character as a younger Indonesian terrorist who masqueraded as a rich playboy with whom Tony Stark was acquainted.

While working on Iron Man (2008), director Jon Favreau omitted the Mandarin in favor of Obadiah Stane as the main antagonist of the film, believing that the character and the fantasy elements of his rings felt unrealistic and were more appropriate for a sequel with an altered tone. Instead, the Mandarin is referenced via the Ten Rings terrorist group in the film.

Early versions of the story of Iron Man 3 (2013) featured the Mandarin as an antagonist, but writer Drew Pearce suggested the idea that the Mandarin was an impostor during one of the writing sessions, with director Shane Black agreeing by making him an actor. This led to the conception of Trevor Slattery, a washed up English actor hired by Aldrich Killian and Advanced Idea Mechanics (AIM) to pose as the Mandarin, with Killian adopting the mantle of the Mandarin as his own as well. The twist revealing that the Mandarin was an imposter received both critical praise and fan backlash; in response to the negative reception, the short film All Hail the King (2014) reconfirmed the existence of the "real" Mandarin.

At Marvel Studios' San Diego Comic-Con panel in July 2019, Kevin Feige revealed that the Mandarin would make his official debut in Shang-Chi and the Legend of the Ten Rings (2021), with acclaimed Hong Kong actor Tony Leung cast in the role; the character's real name "Wenwu" was revealed by Feige during Disney Investor Day in December 2019. After decades of attempting to break into Hollywood due to rejecting degrading and stereotypical roles, Wenwu is Leung's first Hollywood role.

Wenwu is an original character for the Marvel Cinematic Universe who replaces Shang-Chi's original comic book father whom Marvel Studios does not hold the film rights to, serving as a composite character of Fu Manchu and the Mandarin. As the result of Marvel Comics later losing the rights to the Fu Manchu name, his later appearances give him the real name of Zheng Zu, who was previously depicted as the Mandarin and the long-reigning emperor of the wuxia-inspired K'un-Lun region of Battleworld in the continuity of Secret Wars (2015), in which he defeated by his son Shang-Chi after he defeats him in a tournament to decide K'un-Lun's next ruler.

The design of Wenwu's Ten Rings were changed from rings worn on the fingers in the comics to Hung Gar iron rings to avoid comparisons to the Infinity Stones, while taking inspiration from The 36th Chamber of Shaolin (1978).

Characterization
According to producer Jonathan Schwartz, Wenwu has taken on many different names, including "The Mandarin", which he noted came with audience expectations. Schwartz described Wenwu as a more complex and layered character than the comic book version, with director Destin Daniel Cretton adding that there were problematic aspects of the Mandarin's comic book portrayal that he wanted to change. Cretton felt Leung avoided Asian stereotypes and a one-dimensional portrayal by bringing humanity and love to the role. Leung described Wenwu as "a sociopath, a narcissist, a bigot" but refused to call him a villain, explaining that he was "a man with a history, who craves to be loved".

According to screenwriter David Callaham, "'The Mandarin' is a title that has been applied to him in the past by people that don’t understand his culture." The term mandarin from the Portuguese "mandarim" designates a type of bureaucrat in China and wen and wu are a concept of Chinese philosophy and Chinese administration that unites civil (wen) and military (wu) elements, with Wenwu himself associating "mandarin" with "a chicken dish" and mandarin oranges.

Wenwu also says that he was also called "Master Khan", a pseudonym used in the main continuity. This is a possible allusion to the idea that Wenwu is Genghis Khan himself. Before Shang-Chi and the Legend of the Ten Rings, the Ten Rings logo had Mongolian scripts. In Iron Man, Raza said:

In All Hail the King, Jackson Norriss says:

The organization Ten Rings was an original creation of the Marvel Cinematic Universe; the organization resembles Si-Fan from Sax Rohmer's books and the Master of Kung Fu series.  In the animated series Iron Man: Armored Adventures, Gene Khan, the Mandarin leads the Tong. Tong is a name of a type of criminal organization of Chinese immigrants in the United States.

Fictional character biography

Origin

Thousands of years ago, Xu Wenwu finds the Ten Rings, mystical weapons that grant their user immortality and great power. Wenwu amasses an army of warriors called the Ten Rings and conquers many kingdoms and topples governments throughout history. In 1996, Wenwu begins searching for Ta Lo, a village said to harbor various mythical beasts, in order to expand his power. He finds the entrance of the village, but is stopped and defeated by the village's guardian Ying Li. Wenwu and Li fall in love; forbidden from settling in Ta Lo due to his warlord past, Wenwu takes Li with him to his home in China, where they marry and have two children, Shang-Chi and Xialing. Content with his new life, Wenwu gives up the ten rings and renounces his criminal lifestyle to be with his family.

When Li is murdered by the Iron Gang, old rivals of the Ten Rings, Wenwu takes up his rings and takes Shang-Chi with him to the Iron Gang's hideout, where he proceeds to brutally massacre the gangsters. Wenwu subsequently reactivates the Ten Rings organization and has Shang-Chi trained in martial arts as an assassin by Wenwu's minion Death Dealer; Xialing is forbidden from training due to her reminding Wenwu too much of Li. When Shang-Chi is 14, Wenwu sends him on a mission to kill the Iron Gang's leader and avenge Li. Despite his success, Shang-Chi is traumatized by the ordeal and abandons the Ten Rings, with Xialing doing the same six years later.

Copycat attacks

In an effort to cover up explosions triggered by soldiers subjected to the Extremis program, Aldrich Killian and the think tank Advanced Idea Mechanics (AIM) hire English actor Trevor Slattery to portray Wenwu in propaganda videos that are broadcast to the world where he and the Ten Rings claim credit for the explosions. Possessing limited knowledge of Wenwu's history and basing it only on legends of the man, Killian creates the persona of "the Mandarin" for Slattery, and even uses the title for himself; Slattery is completely oblivious to the true meaning of his actions, believing he is only starring in a movie. Wenwu is outraged over the appropriation of his image and organization; with Killian dead due to Tony Stark's actions, Wenwu has Slattery broken out of prison to be executed. However, Wenwu becomes amused by Slattery's performances and has him imprisoned in his compound as a "court jester".

Reuniting his family

Wenwu begins hearing Li's voice, telling him she is trapped in Ta Lo. Wenwu sends his men to take the pendants Li had gifted his children Shang-Chi and Xialing. Razor Fist leads the mission to obtain Shang-Chi's pendant during a bus ride in San Francisco.

When that mission was a success, Wenwu sends his men to take Xialing's pendant at her fight club in Macau which leads to a resulting brawl between Shang-Chi and Xialing against the Ten Rings operatives led by Razor Fist and Death Dealer. Wenwu breaks up the brawl and takes his children and Shang-Chi's friend Katy to the Ten Rings compound.

Once at the Ten Rings compound, he explains Li's predicament and uses her two pendants to create a map that reveals the location and time to enter Ta Lo. Wenwu also reveals his plans to destroy the village after freeing Li and imprisons his children and Katy when they refuse to go through with his plan. The three later escape the compound with Slattery and his hundun companion Morris to warn Ta Lo of the Ten Rings. Instead of giving chase, Wenwu decides to wait until the planned date to invade Ta Lo.

Wenwu and his forces arrive in Ta Lo to destroy the seal holding his wife, prompting a battle between the Ten Rings and the village inhabitants. Shang-Chi attempts to fight Wenwu, but is defeated and cast down into a lake. Guided by Li's voice, Wenwu begins breaking the seal holding her in Ta Lo. Unbeknownst to him, Wenwu is being manipulated by the Dweller-in-Darkness, who was using Li's voice to trick Wenwu into destroying its seal with his ten rings. Revived by the Great Protector, the dragon guardian of Ta Lo, Shang-Chi uses his newfound powers to disarm Wenwu. However, the seal is weakened enough for the Dweller to escape. Realizing his wife is in fact dead, Wenwu sacrifices himself to save Shang-Chi from the Dweller. Reflecting on his strained relationship with Shang-Chi after Li's death, a remorseful Wenwu bequeaths his ten rings to his son who uses them, the Ta Lo fighting style, and the aid of the Great Protector to destroy the Dweller. When the surviving villagers and the Ten Rings members honor the fallen, Shang-Chi lights a paper lantern in memory of his father.

Following Wenwu's death, Xialing takes up leadership of the Ten Rings which she restructures to also include women fighters.

Reception
Angie Han of The Hollywood Reporter praised Tony Leung's sincerity in portraying Wenwu in Shang-Chi and the Legend of the Ten Rings as having him made as a "supervillain with a soul". RogerEbert.coms Nick Allen similarly believed Leung was the film's "most brilliant" casting and enjoyed the various fight sequences featuring him since Destin Daniel Cretton changed the height, light, reflections, and staging for each. Writing for Empire, Laura Sirikul praised Leung's choreography in the film. Jake Cole of Slant Magazine praised Leung as "effortlessly convey[ing] the calm malice with which Wenwu asserts his absolute power as well as the anguish that the man feels over the loss of his wife", although describing the flashbacks featuring the character as "superfluous" with "emotional flatness" that brought the film "to a crawl" each time they were used.

Awards and nominations
Awards and nominations received by Leung for his performance as Wenwu include:

In other media

Video games
 Wenwu made his video game debut in Marvel Future Fight.
 Wenwu is a playable character in Marvel Super War.

See also
 Characters of the Marvel Cinematic Universe

References

Bibliography
McNeal, Robin. Conquer and Govern: Early Chinese Military Texts from the Yi Zhou shu. Honolulu: University of Hawai'i Press, 2012.

External links
 Wenwu at the Marvel Cinematic Universe Wiki
 

Fictional characters with immortality
Fictional Chinese people
Fictional military strategists
Fictional murderers
Fictional people from the 21st-century
Fictional terrorists
Film characters introduced in 2021
Fu Manchu
Identity theft in popular culture
Male characters in film
Martial artist characters in films
Marvel Cinematic Universe original characters
Marvel Comics martial artists
Shang-Chi and the Legend of the Ten Rings
Shang-Chi characters
Male film villains